This was a new event to the WTA 125K series.

Zhang Kailin and Zheng Saisai won the title, defeating Chan Chin-wei and Darija Jurak in the final, 6–3, 6–4.

Seeds

Draw

References 
 Draw

Dalian Women's Tennis Open - Doubles
2015 Doubles